Robert Cheung is a 46-year-old businessman, originally from Hong Kong, China who won a World Series of Poker bracelet in the $1,500 No Limit Hold'em event at the 2007 World Series of Poker for over $675k.  He tied the record for shortest heads-up match by defeating his opponent Richard Murnick in one hand. In fact he owns the record of beating the final three opponents in three consecutive hands. A full report of the final table can 
be found at www.pokernews.com/live-reporting/2007-wsop/event-38-no-limit-holdem/.

Not only does he excel in live tournaments, he also made a name for himself online at pokerstars under ID:Runninggreat. His on line winnings exceeds $500k.
He final tabled twice on Pokerstars' flagship tournament (Sunday Million) within two months, finishing
1st and 4th for a combined prize of over $200,000. He also final tabled the same tournament in 2011 and finished 4th for $70k.

As of the end of 2013,his live tournament winnings exceed $1,400,000. His 15 cashes at the WSOP account for $1 million  of those winnings.

His consistent performance ranks him as the No. 1 (number of cashes) in the province of British Columbia, Canada.
 https://pokerdb.thehendonmob.com/ranking/4110/

World Series of Poker bracelets

Notes

External links
 Hendon Mob tournament results
 

Canadian poker players
Hong Kong emigrants to Canada
Hong Kong businesspeople
Living people
Naturalized citizens of Canada
People from Vancouver
World Series of Poker bracelet winners
Year of birth missing (living people)